Idiothauma africanum is a species of moth of the family Tortricidae. It is found in Cameroon, the Republic of Congo, Equatorial Guinea and Gabon.

References

Moths described in 1897
Hilarographini
Moths of Africa